Two ships of the Royal Navy have been named HMS Hollyhock:

  was an  launched in 1915 and sold for scrap in 1930
  was a  launched in 1940 and sunk in 1942

Royal Navy ship names